Five Chariots (五車, pinyin: Wǔ Ju) is a constellation in Chinese astronomy.

Introduction
A five-star Chinese constellation equivalent to Auriga minus δ Aur (Delta Aurigae).  Also known in Japanese as Gosha (Five Chariots; 五車).

Stars
 Iota Aurigae
 Alpha Aurigae
 Beta Aurigae
 Theta Aurigae
 Gamma Aurigae

Characteristics
The Five Chariots otherwise known as Auriga is a constellation that borders Taurus. The constellation is named as such due to the five main stars, representing the five celestial emperors. The constellation appears within the region of the sky dominated by the White Tiger of the West. Within the region of the White Tiger of the West there are seven mansions, the Five Chariots resides under the net mansion.

Five Celestial Emperors
The Five Celestial Emperors (Wu Ti) represent the five elements. Four of them represent the four seasons, but the fifth represents the center, otherwise known as the circumpolar region. The Eastern Emperor, T'ai Hao, represents wood. The Northern Emperor represents fire, and the Southern Emperor represents water. The one in the middle known as Shao Hao is associated with earth. Finally the Western Emperor, Huang Ti, represents the element metal. They can be recognized by the v-necked coats they wear, this is the case with most major divinities, as well as the regions they occupy. These emperors were in control of life and death, and as such people regularly made sacrifices, or gave offerings, to them. The Celestial Emperors are often depicted in mirrors. They also appear often in the sarcophagi of people that were important during this time period as they played a major role in funerals. This is due to the fact that the emperors are constantly controlling life and death.

Planets
All of the emperors can also be represented by certain planets, for example, the Southern Emperor is often associated with the "fire star" otherwise known as Mars. The Eastern emperor is associated with the "wood star" equivalent to Jupiter. Venus is associated with the Western Emperor as Venus was known as the "metal star". The "water star", known today as Mercury is associated with the Northern Emperor. Lastly the Emperor of the Center is represented by the "Earth star" also known as Saturn.

Colors
Another distinction that can be attributed to each of the emperors is a specific color. The emperor of the East is represented by green, the South red, the Center yellow, the West white, and the North black. Each of the colors that are associated with the Celestial emperors have their own meaning in Chinese culture. The color green is representative of spring, wood, and things that taste sour. White represents metal, as well as fall. It can also be associated with an acrid taste. Black can be seen to represent winter and the element of water, as well as the taste of salt. Yellow is seen as being related to earth and a sweet taste, there is no season as this is the Central Emperor. Summer, fire, and a bitter taste can be related to the color red.

Natures
Each divinity is often associated with a certain nature, regarding their characteristics as individual deities. The Black Emperor, also known as the Black Ruler is represented as a dark warrior. A green dragon is often associated with the Green Ruler. The Red Ruler is often regarded as a scarlet bird. The White Ruler is associated with a white tiger. Lastly the Yellow Ruler is represented by a unicorn. These distinctions directly correlate with the representation of areas of the celestial realm. There is The dark warrior of the North, The Azure Dragon of the East, The Vermillion Bird of the South, and the White Tiger of the West.

References

Sources
 (Chinese) Chen Jiujin 陳久金. 中國星座神話. Published by 台灣書房出版有限公司, 2005, .

Chinese constellations